Jaime Arbós Serra (born February 29, 1952) is a former field hockey player from Spain, who won the silver medal with the Men's National Team at the 1980 Summer Olympics in Moscow. He competed in four Olympics for Spain, starting in 1972.

References
Spanish Olympic Committee

External links
 

1952 births
Living people
Spanish male field hockey players
Field hockey players from Catalonia
Olympic field hockey players of Spain
Olympic silver medalists for Spain
Field hockey players at the 1972 Summer Olympics
Field hockey players at the 1976 Summer Olympics
Field hockey players at the 1980 Summer Olympics
Field hockey players at the 1984 Summer Olympics
Olympic medalists in field hockey
Medalists at the 1980 Summer Olympics
Atlètic Terrassa players
Sportspeople from Terrassa
20th-century Spanish people